The Gibson ES-359 is a semi-hollow body guitar which was manufactured in Gibson's Memphis Custom Shop in Memphis, Tennessee. The guitar is an upscaled version of the ES-339, featuring gold hardware,  a multi-ply binding on the front and back of the body, and block pearloid inlays on the fretboard.

The Gibson ES-359 closely related to the ES-335, although the body is smaller than the ES-335, closer to the size of a Les Paul model.

In terms of electronics, the ES-359 uses what Gibson calls the Memphis Tone Circuit, which preserves the high frequencies as the volume is decreased.

External links 
Gibson ES-359

Semi-acoustic guitars
ES-359